The Nazko First Nation is a First Nations government of the Dakelh people in the north-central Interior of British Columbia.  Its reserves are located around the community of Nazko, British Columbia, which is 120 km west of Quesnel and southwest of Prince George.

Nazko/Ndazkoh is located on the Nazko River and ndazkoh means "river flowing from the south".

Indian reserves

Indian Reserves under the administration of the Nazko First Nation are:
Baezaeko River Indian Reserve No. 25,  NW of Fishpot Lake, 64.70 ha. 
Baezaeko River Indian Reserve No. 26, on the Baezaeko River,  NW of Fishpot Lake, 64.70 ha. 
Baezaeko River Indian Reserve No. 27, on the Baezaeko River adjoining IRs No. 25 and 26, 16.20 ha. 
Coglistiko River Indian Reserve No. 29, on a small unnamed lake  NW of Fishpot Lake, 64.80 ha. 
Deep Creek Indian Reserve No. 5, 1/2 mile N of the West Road River,  W of the mouth of Pantage Creek, 1.0 ha. 
Euchinico Creek Indian Reserve No. 17, on the West Road River,  S of the mouth of Euchiniko Creek, 358.60 ha. 
Euchinico Creek Indian Reserve No. 18,  S of the mouth of Euchiniko Creek, 129.50 ha. 
Euchinico Creek Indian Reserve No. 19, on a small creek,  SW of Nuntzun (Cultus) Lake, 129.50 ha. 
Fishpot Lake Indian Reserve No. 24, on north shore of Fishpot Lake,  W of Stump Lake, 2.0 ha. 
Lower Fishpot Lake Indian Reserve No. 24A, on a small unnamed lake  W of Stump Lake, 52.40 ha. 
Michelle Creek Indian Reserve No. 22, at the headwaters of Michelle Creeik, 48.60 ha. 
Michelle Creek Indian Reserve No. 23, at the headwaters of Michelle Creek east of and adjoining IR No. 22, 64.70 ha. 
Nahlquonate Indian Reserve No. 2, on left (N) bank of the West Road River  W of its mouth on the Fraser River, 87.80 ha. 
Nazco Indian Reserve No. 20, on the Nazko River at Stump Lake, 463.80 ha. 
Nazco Cemetery Indian Reserve No. 20A, on the Nazko River, north of Stump Lake, north of and adjoining IR No. 20. 0.10 ha. 
Redwater Creek Indian Reserve No. 30, on two small lakes,  SW of Redwater Lake, 64.70 ha. 
Trout Lake Johny Indian Reserve No. 15,  S of Nutzun (Cultus) Lake, 64.80 ha.

References

Dakelh governments
Central Interior of British Columbia